Pam Shriver and Elizabeth Smylie were the defending champions but only Shriver competed that year with Lori McNeil.

McNeil and Shriver lost in the first round to Kristie Boogert and Valda Lake.

Gigi Fernández and Natasha Zvereva won in the final 6–0, 6–3 against Lindsay Davenport and Rennae Stubbs.

Seeds
Champion seeds are indicated in bold text while text in italics indicates the round in which those seeds were eliminated.

 Gigi Fernández /  Natasha Zvereva (champions)
 Lindsay Davenport /  Rennae Stubbs (final)
 Lori McNeil /  Pam Shriver (first round)
 Patty Fendick /  Mary Pierce (first round)

Draw

External links
 1995 Toray Pan Pacific Open Doubles Draw

Pan Pacific Open
Toray Pan Pacific Open - Doubles
1995 Toray Pan Pacific Open